Phractura tenuicauda is a species of catfish in the genus Phractura. It has a length of 9.5 cm. It lives in the Congo river system.

References 

tenuicauda
Freshwater fish of Africa
Fish described in 1902
Taxa named by George Albert Boulenger